In computing, a print job is a file or set of files that has been submitted to be printed with a printer.

Jobs are typically identified by a unique number, and are assigned to a particular destination, usually a printer. Jobs can also have options associated with them such as media size, number of copies and priority.

A Print Job is a single queueable print system object that represents a document that needs to be rendered and transferred to a printer. Printer jobs are created on specific print queues and can not be transferred between print queues.

Components
Job Id: Uniquely identifies the print job for the given print queue.

Spool file: It is responsible for the on-disk representation of data.

Shadow File: It is responsible for the on-disk representation of the job configuration.

Status: We can this in three parts :

 Spooling: It represents the message that the printing application is still working.
 Printing: It represents the message that spool file is being read by the print processor
 Printed: It represents the message that the job has been fully written to the port.

Data Type: It Identifies the format of the data in the spool file like EMF, RAW.

Other configuration: Name, set of named properties, etc

Route 
In larger environments, print jobs may go through a centralized print server, before reaching the printing destination. Some (multifunction) printers have local storage (like a hard disk drive) to process and queue the jobs before printing.

Security 
When getting rid of old printers with local storage, one should keep in mind that confidential print jobs (documents) are potentially still locally unencrypted on the hard disk drive and can be undeleted.

See also
print (command)

References

Computer printing